John Manners (April 8, 1786 – June 24, 1853) was an American physician, lawyer, and politician who served as President of the New Jersey Senate.

Biography
Manners was born in 1786 in the now-defunct municipality of Amwell Township, Hunterdon County, New Jersey to John and Rachel (Stout) Manners. He went to Philadelphia to read medicine with Benjamin Rush and Thomas Cooper, graduating from the University of Pennsylvania School of Medicine in 1812. He received an honorary Master of Arts degree from the College of New Jersey (now Princeton University) in 1816. He returned to Hunterdon County to practice medicine, residing in Flemington and later settling in Clinton Township.

Manners read law with James Madison Porter of Easton, Pennsylvania and was licensed to practice law in the highest courts. He represented Hunterdon County in the New Jersey Senate from 1850 to 1852, serving as Senate President in 1852.

Manners died in Clinton in 1853 from "affection of the heart." He was interred at Mercer Cemetery in Trenton.

Family
Manners married Eliza Cooper (1790–1840), the daughter of Thomas Cooper, in Philadelphia on August 2, 1810. He was the first cousin of David Stout Manners and the first cousin thrice removed of Horace Griggs Prall.

References

External links
 John Manners at The Political Graveyard

People from Clinton Township, New Jersey
People from Flemington, New Jersey
Perelman School of Medicine at the University of Pennsylvania alumni
Physicians from New Jersey
New Jersey lawyers
New Jersey state senators
Presidents of the New Jersey Senate
1786 births
1853 deaths
19th-century American politicians
American lawyers admitted to the practice of law by reading law
19th-century American lawyers